After Hours is an album led by organist Richard "Groove" Holmes recorded in 1961 and 1962 and released on the Pacific Jazz label.

Reception

The Allmusic review by Scott Yanow calls it: "a strong sampling of the organist's talents on a variety of blues, bop standards, and obscure originals".

Track listing 
All compositions by Richard Holmes except as indicated
 "Hallelujah I Love Her So" (Ray Charles) - 2:30
 "After Hours" (Avery Parrish) - 5:25
 "Groove's Bag" - 6:45
 "Sweatin'" - 3:35
 "Groove Bird" - 5:32
 "Minor Surgery" - 4:13
 "Do It My Way" - 4:55
 "Jeannine" (Duke Pearson) - 2:54
Recorded at Pacific Jazz Studios in Hollywood, CA in 1961 (tracks 1, 2 & 7) and 1962 (tracks 3-6 & 8).

Personnel 
Richard "Groove" Holmes - organ
Gene Edwards (tracks 1, 2 & 7), Joe Pass (tracks 3-6 & 8) - guitar
Leroy Henderson (tracks 1, 2 & 7), Lawrence Marable (tracks 3-6 & 8) - drums

References 

Richard Holmes (organist) albums
1962 albums
Pacific Jazz Records albums